Anthony "Tony" Porter (born 10 February 1952) is a retired Church of England bishop who served as the suffragan Bishop of Sherwood in the Diocese of Southwell and Nottingham from 2006 to 2020.

Early life and education
Porter was born at RAF Halton, Buckinghamshire on 10 February 1952. He was one of four children of a building society manager. He went to school at Gravesend Grammar School and university at Hertford College, Oxford, before training for ordination at Ridley Hall, Cambridge.

Career
Porter was made a deacon at St Peter's Day (29 June) 1977, by Bill Westwood, Bishop of Edmonton, at John Keble Church, Mill Hill, and ordained a priest the Petertide following (25 June 1978), by Gerald Ellison, Bishop of London, at St Paul's Cathedral. From 1977–1980, Porter served his first curacy at Edgware Parish Church in the Diocese of London, and from 1980–1983 was curate at St Mary's Haughton Green in the Diocese of Manchester. From 1983–1987, he was priest in charge of Christ Church, Bacup, Lancashire, and was made vicar of that congregation in 1987.

In 1991, he was made rector of Holy Trinity Platt Church, Rusholme, Manchester. During his time in Manchester, he was also chaplain to both Manchester City F.C. and Greater Manchester Police, and became Honorary Canon of Manchester Cathedral in 2004.

On 4 November 2005, it was announced that Porter would be appointed to the episcopate as Bishop of Sherwood, the suffragan bishop of the Diocese of Southwell and Nottingham. He was consecrated on 21 March 2006 in York Minster by John Sentamu, Archbishop of York. Porter was Acting Bishop of Southwell and Nottingham from the translation of Paul Butler to Durham on 20 January until he relinquished the additional role due to ill health on 9 April 2014. Porter is retired effective 22 March 2020.

Besides his clerical posts, Porter has also written several books. In retirement, he is licensed as an honorary assistant bishop of the Diocese of Blackburn.

Marriage and family
Porter has been married since 1974, and they have four children. Porter enjoys sport, having played cricket and hockey for many years.

Styles
The Reverend Tony Porter (1977–2004)
The Reverend Canon Tony Porter (2004–2006)
The Right Reverend Tony Porter (2006–present)

References

External links
York Minster news

1952 births
Living people
Bishops of Sherwood
Alumni of Hertford College, Oxford
People educated at Gravesend Grammar School